The 2005 Los Angeles bomb plot was a 2005 effort by a group of ex-convicts calling themselves  Jamiyyat Ul-Islam Is-Saheeh to bomb several military bases, a number of synagogues, and an Israeli consulate  in California.

On 31 August 2005, Kevin James and three other men were indicted on terrorism charges related to conspiracy to attack military facilities in the Los Angeles area and of attempting to fund their campaign by robbing gas stations in Southern California over the previous three months.  Kevin James was accused of founding a radical Islamic group called J.I.S (Jam’iyyat Ul-Islam Is-Saheehجمعية الإسلام الصحيح , Arabic for "Assembly of Authentic Islam") from his cell in Folsom Prison in California, and of recruiting fellow inmates to join his mission to target for violent attack so-called enemies of Islam or "infidels".

The announcement of the arrests was made by the Attorney-General Alberto Gonzales in the presence of the director of the FBI Robert Mueller in Washington D.C. Robert Mueller mentioned the incident in a "Major Executive Speech" in June 2006 on the day that the 2006 Sears Tower plot was announced.  The Deputy Assistant Director of the FBI outlined the case in his congressional testimony in September 2006.

Background

The plot is one in a series of terrorist-related attacks and failed attacks by Muslims on military installations in the United States, including the 2009 New York terrorism plot, the  2007 Fort Dix attack plot, the 2009 Little Rock recruiting office shooting, and the September 11 attacks on the Pentagon.

Suspects
 Kevin James, founded J.I.S. (Jam’iyyat Ul-Islam Is-Saheeh) in 2004 while in prison, recruiting fellow inmates, and then others after his release in December 2004.
 Levar Haley Washington, Muslim convert, a U.S. national; arrested 5 July for armed robbery.
 Gregory Vernon Patterson, a U.S. national; purchased a .223-caliber rifle and arrested 5 July for armed robbery.
 Hammad Riaz Samana, a lawful permanent U.S. resident originally from Pakistan; allegedly trained with firearms; arrested 2 August.

Several of the suspects formed a group called Jam’iyyat Ul-Islam Is-Saheeh from inside a California state prison About a month later, Washington was released from prison and recruited Patterson and Samana, neither of whom had a criminal record, at an Inglewood mosque.

Conviction
On 14 December 2007, Kevin James pleaded guilty to "conspiracy to levy war against the United States through terrorism" and faces up to 20 years in federal prison.  Levar Washington also pleaded guilty to the same in addition to a weapons charge and could get 25.

Gregory Patterson is expected to accept a plea deal, and Hammad Samana is currently undergoing psychiatric treatment.

In an interview with the prosecutor, the reporter remarked that "the cell appears to have been remarkably indiscreet about committing plans to paper. They even left the text of a press release Mr. James had written for use once they committed a successful attack. And one of the ringleaders, James, was in prison the whole time."  Documents such as these formed the basis of the evidence, since the group hadn't gotten to the point of gathering materials to make explosives.

A 2011 NPR report claimed some of the people associated with this case were imprisoned in a highly restrictive Communication Management Unit.

See also

Islamic extremism in the United States
Conversion to Islam in prisons
2009 Little Rock military recruiting office shooting – al-Qaeda in the Arabian Peninsula-inspired attack by Yemen-trained jihadi
2009 Bronx terrorism plot – a plot by four black American Muslim men to shoot down military airplanes flying out of an Air National Guard base and blow up two synagogues
2011 Manhattan terrorism plot – an effort by two Muslim Arab-Americans to bomb a synagogue
List of attacks on Jewish institutions in the United States

References

External links

Antisemitism in California
Explosions in 2005
Terrorist incidents in the United States in 2005
Islamic terrorism in California
Failed terrorist attempts in the United States
Antisemitic attacks and incidents in the United States
2005 crimes in the United States
Terrorist incidents in Los Angeles
Bomb plot